Opus emplectum is an advanced Roman construction technique. Each side of a wall is constructed with finished stone blocks, leaving a substantial void between them. The void is filled with a mixture of broken stones mixed with mortar. A good example of this technique are the ruins of the Romanesque tower in Strzelno.

References

Roman construction techniques
Masonry